The title Footballer of the Year of Israel has been bestowed annually since 1960 by the Israeli newspaper Maariv at the end of each season. In the years 1963, 1966 and 1991 two players have been honoured. Mordechai Spiegler, who is considered the foremost player in Israeli football history, has between 1964 and 1971, been given the accolade a record four times.

Winners

References
rsssf.com: Israel - Player of the Year

Footballers in Israel
Association football player of the year awards by nationality
Awards established in 1965
1965 establishments in Israel
Israeli sports trophies and awards
Annual events in Israel
Association football player non-biographical articles